Frank Conover (born April 6, 1968) is a former American football defensive tackle. He played for the Cleveland Browns in 1991.

References

1968 births
Living people
American football defensive tackles
Syracuse Orange football players
Cleveland Browns players
People from Manalapan Township, New Jersey
Sportspeople from Monmouth County, New Jersey